Canada-United States Union may refer to either of the following proposals:

Movements for the annexation of Canada to the United States
North American Union